Odell Carl Barry (October 10, 1941 – January 3, 2022) was an American professional football player who was a wide receiver for the Denver Broncos in the American Football League (AFL). He played college football at Findlay University under head coach Byron E. Morgan. He played professionally for the Broncos in 1964 and 1965. Barry became a real-estate agent and then mayor of Northglenn, Colorado from 1980 to 1982. He also served as a delegate to the 1980 Democratic National Convention.

Barry died from heart disease on January 3, 2022, at the age of 80.

See also
List of American Football League players

References

1941 births
2022 deaths
Tennessee Democrats
American athlete-politicians
American football wide receivers
Denver Broncos (AFL) players
Findlay Oilers football players
People from Adams County, Colorado
Mayors of places in Colorado
Colorado Democrats
Businesspeople from Colorado
Players of American football from Memphis, Tennessee
Politicians from Memphis, Tennessee
20th-century African-American people